Carla Harvey (born October 4, 1976) is an American singer, songwriter, musician, author, artist, actress, and former nude model. She is best known as co-vocalist of the American heavy metal band Butcher Babies. She landed her first job in Hollywood as an Entertainment Reporter for the Playboy Channel, and appeared on many popular network TV shows like Rules of Engagement. Harvey took a break from the entertainment world to earn a degree in Mortuary Science from California's Cypress College, and worked as an embalmer and funeral director before forming the Butcher Babies and pursuing her lifelong dream of being a touring musician.

Harvey is passionate about writing. She was named a "comic book mastermind" by Hustler. Her first published comic book Butcher Babies was released with great success at San Diego Comic-Con 2011. Her first full-length novel, Death and Other Dances, was released in 2014, and a new comic series entitled Soul Sucka was released in 2015.

Early life
Harvey is of Irish-Ethiopian descent through her father and of Finnish-Italian descent through her mother. She attended Glenn Levey Middle School in Southfield, Michigan. As a teenager, she attended Mercy High School (all-girl private Catholic) and Harrison High School, both in Farmington Hills, Michigan. Carla also has a degree in mortuary science from California's Cypress College, and is a licensed funeral director and embalmer. In an interview, she said that "She hopes to one day open her own funeral home, but for now, she's enjoying life on the road with the Butcher Babies." She also worked as a nude model and had appeared in several softcore adult features, sometimes using the alias Bridget Banks. Among these are At Your Service (2006), Decadent Dreams (2005), and Bedtime Secrets (2008). Harvey also appeared in Hustler's rap-porn compilation Snoop Dogg's Doggystyle XXX DVD (2001), but did not perform any explicit acts and was only featured as a dancer.

Reaction to criticism 
Harvey and her fellow Butcher Babies vocalist, Heidi Shepherd, have been subject to some negative criticism. In an interview with Blabbermouth.net, Harvey said: "There's always gonna be haters. We actually don't really play into the negativity, or read into the negativity. I think people are afraid of sexuality, especially Americans." Harvey supports greater female representation in the metal music scene.

Personal life
As of 2019, she started dating Charlie Benante, the drummer of American thrash metal band Anthrax.

Discography

With Butcher Babies
 Blonde Girls All Look the Same (Single) (2011)
 Butcher Babies (EP) (2012)
 Goliath (2013)
 Uncovered (EP) (2014)
 Take It Like a Man (2015)
 Lilith (2017)

Musical influences
Harvey has cited her influences as Pantera, Slayer, Metallica, Black Sabbath, Iron Maiden, Slipknot, and the Plasmatics. However, in an interview, she has stated that her main musical heroes are Slash and Jimi Hendrix. She said: "As a biracial kid growing up in the Detroit area, I got a lot of shit for loving hard rock and metal, and seeing musicians that were also African American playing the music I loved made me strong enough to say, 'Fuck you, I'm going to like what I want.'" She is also heavily influenced by horror movies such as  The Texas Chain Saw Massacre, House of 1000 Corpses, and The Devil's Rejects.

References

External links
 

 
 

1976 births
African-American rock musicians
African-American rock singers
American female adult models
American women heavy metal singers
American people of Italian descent
American people of Finnish descent
American people of Irish descent
American people of Ethiopian descent
Living people
Singers from Detroit
21st-century American singers
21st-century American women singers
21st-century American actresses